The OTI Festival 1979 was the eighth edition of the annual OTI Festival. It was held in Caracas, Venezuela after decided in a draw. Organised by the Organización de Televisión Iberoamericana (OTI) and host broadcaster Venevisión, the contest was held at the National Theatre of the Military Academy on Saturday 8 December 1979 and was hosted by Eduardo Serrano and Carmen Victoria Pérez.

In this edition in which the number of participating countries rose again to 21, Argentina won for the very first time the festival with the performer Daniel Ríolobos and his song "Cuenta conmigo" (Count on me).

Background 
In the original rules of the OTI Festival the participating broadcaster of the winning country would organise the festival in the next year's edition, but in the previous festival those rules could not be applied due to the tough situation in Nicaragua, the winner country in 1977. As a result, Santiago, the capital city of Chile turned into the host city of the festival in 1978. Brazil was the winning country of the last year's edition with Denise de Kalafe and her song "El amor...Cosa tan rara" (Love... Such a strange thing), but again the Iberoamerican Television Organisation decided to organise a draw in order to select the host city of the VIII OTI festival.

Caracas, the capital city of Venezuela, was chosen as the host place of this edition of the festival and Venevision, the participating broadcaster of the Caribbean country turned into the organiser of the event. This festival is remembered in Venezuela as the very first show that was broadcast live in color.

Venue 
The selected venue for this edition of the festival was the Theatre of the Military Academy of Caracas, which is a cultural hall that was built in 1953. This hall, which is located in the district of Santa Mónica, next to the "Avenew of the Porcers, has hosted, since it was opened, many theatrical performances, dance shows (for example those of the Venezuelan Academy of classical dance), concerts, other cultural activities and the beauty contest of Miss Venezuela for many years. Although it initially had a seat capacity for only 400 people, the hall, which is administrated by the Venezuelan Ministry of Defence, was reformed and by the time Caracas was selected as the host place of the OTI Festival the theatre already had seats for more than 1.000 people turning into the biggest theatre of the Venezuelan capital.

This venue was selected after a committee between the head members of Venevision, the privately owned Venezuelan OTI member and participating Broadcaster.

Participating countries 
The number of participating countries returned to the record that was established in the sixth edition of the festival which was held in Madrid back in 1977. Twenty one countries sent a their delegations, performers and bands to Caracas. As usual, both state financed and private broadcasting networks that were active members of the Iberoamerican Television Organisation participated in this edition of the festival, amongst them, the host broadcaster Venevision.

As usual some of the participating countries such as Mexico, Guatemala, Chile, and also Venezuela, the host country, selected their participating entrants through live-broadcast national finals in order to select their participants. Other broadcasters with a higher or lower level of technical or economical resources, decided to select their entrant and song internally.

Unlike the previous two years, there were no withdraws in this edition of the festival and two traditional participating countries decided to return to the event such as Guatemala, which had withdrawed in the previous edition after the disappointing place the Guatemalan delegation got in Madrid two years before. Portugal also made the decision to return to the event after a one-year withdrawal because of the also unexpected low result of their performer two years before in the Spanish capital city.

Participating performers 

It must be taken the participation of the Portuguese entrant José Cid, who one year later, in 1980, would represent his country in the Eurovision Song Contest in The Hague getting for his country their best position till 1996. He would return the OTI Festival one year later in 1971.

In México, Televisa decided to select their entrant through their traditional and enormously popular "National OTI Contest", which was their national final. In this edition as happened last year, there was a huge scandal when Estela Nuñez, who was an unknown singer back then,won with the support of the jurors against the preferences of the audience. In that country the favourites to represent México in the international and main OTI Festival were the widely popular performers Yuri  and Emmanuel. Although the selection of Estela Nuñez with her song "Vivir sin ti" (To live without you) initially angered the audience, she was applauded after her reprise performance.

The Chilean performer Patricia Maldonado was also selected by the traditional Chilean national final. Although Maldonado was already very popular and recognised in Chile when she was selected, her selection is mainly attributed to her support for the Augusto Pinochet military dictatorship.

Ednita Nazario, who was selected internally by Telemundo to represent Puerto Rico in Caracas, is nowadays a very recognised personality in her home country, in Latin-America and in the Spanish Language communities of the United States of America. In the next edition of the OTI Festival which was held in Buenos Aires, she was awarded because of the composition of the winning song.

The Spanish entrant Rosa María Lobo, who was internally selected and who participated in the OTI Festival with her song "Viviré" (I will live) was already popular in Spain thanks to her participations in the Benidorm Festival and her debut and subsequent studio albums.

The host performer, the Venezuelan Delia Dorta was selected to represent Venezuela after winning the preselection that Venevision used to produce in order to select the competing entrant. She sang in the festival the nostalgic ballad "Cuando era niño" (When I was a kid) which turned into a hit in the Caribbean country.

Daniel Riolobos, who was the Argentine entrant and the one who would attract the most of the attention participated representing his country with the song "Cuenta conmigo" (Count with me) which was composed by the bolero composer Chico Novarro ended up being acclaimed by the jurors.

Presenters 
Two well known Venezuelan presenters, the telenovela actor Eduardo Serrano and the Carmen Victoria Pérez who was very popular at the time and one of the best-known faces in the country for presenting Miss Venezuela for many years, which is to this day the most watched television program in the country, were announced as this year's presenters. Eduardo Serrano, who was, and still is known for his participation in Venezuelan telenovelas, (Latin American soap operas).

As the presenters used to do every year, after the opening act they made a brief introduction of the show highlighting the goals of the OTI as a media organisation and those of the OTI Festival as a showcase of talented performers in Latin America.

When the performance round started, both presenters made a brief individual introduction of the participating singers, quoting the name of the entrants, the lyricist and the director of the Orchestra.

When the performance round ended, the presenters started contacting the jurors of every participating country from the theatre, including the jurors from the host country who were located in the Venevision studios. Both presenters also announced the three most voted contestants when the voting was over.

Running order 
As happened from the inaugural edition in Madrid in 1972 and in the following ones, the host broadcaster, in this case Venevision in collaboration with the Iberoamerican Television Organisation (OTI) organised a draw in Caracas few days before the event took place.

The entrant of the Netherlands Antilles Don Ramon was the first to open the performance round with his song "Mi niño" (My child), which received negative criticism and not a lot of enthusiasm. Anyway this entry got a respectable ninth place, the best one that this country got in the OTI Festival.

The Puerto Rican performer Ednita Nazario was the third one to take the stage with her ballad "Cadenas de fuego" (Fire Chains), which was well received by the local and Venezuelan press turning into one of the main favourites to win the event.

Daniel Riolobos, who represented his country, Argentina was the tenth performer to perform during the night with critical acclaim before the event took place, which made him another main favourite to win the festival.

The host contestant Delia Dorta was the 12th singer to enter the stage with the song "Cuando era niño" (When I was a kid). She was also one of the main favourites to win the event because the ilussion that her entry brought since her selection.

Portugal with José Cid and his song "Na cabana junto à praia" was received with admiration by the audience and by the jurors. He was the sixteenth performer to take the stage.

Another great favourite, the Spaniard Rosa María Lobo was the entrant to end the performance round with her song "Viviré" (I will live).

Voting system 
The voting system followed the same process of the previous years in which the national juries were contacted by telephone by the presenters. Each participating country had seven jurors. The jurors elected, each one, only their favourite song among the participating entries. The scoreborard was located in the left wall of the music hall.

The national juries of every participating country were contacted directly by telephone by the presenters from the National Theatre of the Military Academy in order to know the decision of the jurors. The jury members of Venezuela, the host country, were located in the central studios of Venevision in Caracas.

Result 
The festival was won by the Argentine entrant Daniel Riolobos with his song "Cuenta Conmigo"  (Count on me) with 43 points, ten points of difference in comparison with the second position, the host contestant Delia Dorta who got 33 points.

The third position went to the Portuguese José Cid with 32 points, only one point of difference with Delia Dorta, the Venezuelan representative. The furth place went to the Spaniard Rosa María Lobo with the song "Viviré" (I will live) which got 25 points.

There was a tie in the fifth place between the contestant from Brazil Represented by Miltinho with his song "Conselho" (Advice) and the Puerto Rican performer Ednita Nazario with Cadenas de fuego "Fire chains".

The Mexican singer Estela Nuñez got the eight place with 18 points.

The Ecuadorian representative Miguel Ángel Vergara got the last lace with zero points with his song "Como tener tu cariño" (How to have your love)

Impact 
The audience figures just as happened in the previous year, reached the level of 300 million viewers. The show was acclaimed due to the successful debut of the four participating Chilean broadcasters in the color broadcasting. The quality of the sound system and the stage were also highly valued by the media.

Daniel Riolobos, the winner got his career boosted thanks to the victory he got for Argentina, the first one that the South American country would get in their history in the OTI Festival.

Delia Dorta, the second classificate would turn into an important singer in the Venezuelan music scene after her second place in the contest. From then on, her voice would be heard in many TV commercials. She would also appear for many times in the programme Super Sábado Sensacional, the most popular show aired by Venevision.

Miltinho, the famous Brazilian Samba performer who got the fifth place in this edition of the OTI Festival would go on with his already successful career releasing many studio albums and hit songs.

Other performers such as the Peruvian José Escajadillo, specialised in Creollan music would enjoy a successful career after getting the eleventh place in this edition of the festival with the song "Benito Gazeta".

See also 
 Eurovision Song Contest 1979
 OTI Festival 1978

References

External links 
 https://web.archive.org/web/20120315041724/http://www.telefonica.net/web2/eurovision/sevince/oti1.htm
 http://laoti.blogspot.com/search/label/1979.-%20CARACAS

OTI Festival by year
Music festivals in Venezuela
1979 in Venezuela
1979 in Latin music
Venevisión original programming